Solar eclipses visible from Australia are relatively common. A solar eclipse occurs when the Moon passes between Earth and the Sun, thereby totally or partially obscuring Earth's view of the Sun. The shadows of solar eclipses often cross the Australian continent due to its large area of over 7.6 million square kilometers. However a view of totality from the continent is rare, with totality occurring over the Australian continent only five times during the 20th century AD, although it is predicted to occur more frequently, eleven times, during the 21st century AD.

Succession
Table of previous and next eclipses visible from all states and the Northern Territory; dates sourced from Time and Date AS.

Total and annular eclipses

Total eclipses
Total solar eclipses visible on the Australian continent, 1800–2100.

Annular eclipses
Annular solar eclipses visible on the Australian continent, 1800–2100.

Partial eclipses
Solar eclipses visible partially on the Australian continent, 1800–2100.

1801–1850

1851–1900

1901–1950

1951–2000

2001–2049

2051–2100

Eclipses visible from capital cities 
Total and annual eclipses visible in each capital city, 1800-2100.

Canberra 
 Solar eclipse of October 14, 2042 (annular)

Melbourne 
 Solar eclipse of July 30, 1916 (annular)
 Solar eclipse of October 23, 1976 (total)

Brisbane 
 Solar eclipse of August 7, 1831 (total)
 Solar eclipse of July 13, 2037 (total)
 Solar eclipse of January 27, 2093 (total)

Sydney 
 Solar eclipse of July 22, 2028 (total)
 Solar eclipse of April 10, 2089 (annular)

Adelaide 
 Solar eclipse of March 4, 1802 (total)
 Solar eclipse of July 30, 1916 (annular)

Perth 
 Solar eclipse of April 8, 1959 (annular)
 Solar eclipse of May 31, 2068 (total)

Hobart 
 Solar eclipse of May 9, 1910 (total)
 Solar eclipse of July 30, 1916 (annular)
 Solar eclipse of February 4, 1981 (annular)

See also

 Lists of lunar eclipses

References

External links
 Solar and Lunar Eclipses in Australia – Next 10 Years, by Time and Date AS
 Solar Eclipses in Australia 2000–2040, by Joe Cali

Astronomy in Australia
Solar eclipses
Australia, visible from
Historical events in Australia